Koss City is the fourth album by French musician Lord Kossity, released in 2002 on the label Naïve Records.

Track listing

Chart

References

2002 albums
Lord Kossity albums